Mudaliyar Arulappu Bastiampillay Rajendra (1884–1963) was a  Ceylon Tamil civil servant and member of the Senate of Ceylon.

Early life and family
Rajendra was born in 1884. He was educated at St. Patrick's College, Jaffna. 

Rajendra had seven children.

Career
After school Rajendra joined the Government Clerical Service. After a series of promotions he became an Administrative Officer at the Education Department. He worked at the department for nearly 35 years.

Rajendra was an official translator for the government and Interpreter Mudaliyar to the British Governor. He was made a Member of the Order of the British Empire in the 1953 New Year Honours.

Later life
After retirement Rajendra was appointed to the Senate of Ceylon. He died in 1963.

References

1884 births
1963 deaths
Alumni of St. Patrick's College, Jaffna
Ceylonese Members of the Order of the British Empire
People from British Ceylon
Mudaliyars of Ceylon
Members of the Senate of Ceylon
Sri Lankan Tamil civil servants
Sri Lankan Tamil politicians